Patissa rubrilinealis is a moth in the family Crambidae. It was described by George Hampson in 1919. It is found in Malawi.

The wingspan is about 12 mm. The forewings are silvery white with a scarlet medial line from below the costa to the inner margin. The hindwings are silvery white.

References

Endemic fauna of Malawi
Moths described in 1919
Schoenobiinae